Brenda's Time is an Australian television series which aired in 1959 on Melbourne station HSV-7. It featured Brenda Marshall, a HSV personality of the period. It aired in a 15-minute time-slot, and appears to have been an interview show. It aired on Wednesdays at 4:00PM, preceded by Menu for Tomorrow and followed at 4:15PM by imported drama Scarlet Pimpernel.

References

External links

1959 Australian television series debuts
1959 Australian television series endings
English-language television shows
Black-and-white Australian television shows
Australian television talk shows